Helen Austin may refer to:

Helen Cloud Austin, American social worker
Helen Elsie Austin (1908–2004), American lawyer and diplomat
Helen Vickroy Austin (1829–1921), American journalist and horticulturist